Xihuayuan Subdistrict is a subdistrict in Yungang District, Datong, Shanxi, China. , it has 5 residential communities under its administration.

See also 
 List of township-level divisions of Shanxi

References 

Township-level divisions of Shanxi
Datong